Kremandala is a Belizean football team which currently competes in the Belize Premier Football League (BPFL) of the Football Federation of Belize.

The club based in San Ignacio Cayo in the Cayo District.  The team's home stadium is Norman Broaster Stadium.

Football clubs in Belize
Kremandala Ltd.